Charles Kevin Coventry Sr. (22 September 1958 – 7 August 2011) was a Zimbabwean international cricket umpire who stood in five One Day Internationals between 2000 and 2001. His son is Zimbabwe international cricketer Charles Coventry. He died in 2011 at the age of 52 following a heart attack at his home in Bulawayo.

See also
 List of One Day International cricket umpires

References

External links
Profile at ESPNcricinfo
Profile at CricketArchive

1958 births
2011 deaths
Sportspeople from Kwekwe
White Zimbabwean sportspeople
Zimbabwean One Day International cricket umpires